VET-Bib is a bibliographic database covering European vocational education and training (VET) literature maintained by the European Centre for the Development of Vocational Training (Cedefop). 

The Cedefop library exists since 1975. One of its main tasks is to provide reference services on VET.

Database content 
VET-Bib contains over 80.000 references on the topics related to Cedefop's priorities:
 vocational education and training (VET) policy and systems
 qualifications, competences and skills
 vocational guidance and career counselling
 skill needs and shortages
 adult education, continuous and lifelong learning
 informal learning and nonformal learning
 training research
 VET teachers and trainers
 assessment and recognition of learning outcomes and diplomas
 European tools such as the European Qualifications Framework, Europass, and the European Credit System for Vocational Education and Training
 labour mobility and migrant workers
Approximately two thirds of the complete VET-Bib collection is available in full text. VET-Bib is multilingual and all European Union languages are represented in the database.

Database development 
The development of VET-Bib is shared between the following institutions: 
 Cedefop's library and documentation service: responsible for European and international references, also provides guidelines for collection development, and the indexing tool European Training Thesaurus
 , Cedefop's decentralised network consisting of 27 partners in all EU member states plus Norway and Iceland: each national ReferNet partner provides national references to VET-Bib

Sub products 
 VET-Alert: a monthly review on what has just been published on vocational education and training 
 VET bibliographies: These are thematic pre-defined bibliographies on key topics of vocational education and training: skill needs, E-learning, Validation of non-formal and informal learning, green skills, lifelong guidance, lifelong learning, etc.

See also 
 Education Resources Information Center
 International Bibliography of the Social Sciences
 List of academic databases and search engines

References

External links 
 

Education in the European Union
Bibliographic databases and indexes
Vocational education